Henry Curtis Thompson (December 8, 1925 – September 30, 1969) was an American player in the Negro leagues and Major League Baseball who played primarily as a third baseman. A left-handed batter, he played with the Dallas Green Monarchs (1941), Kansas City Monarchs (1943, 1946–47, 1948), St. Louis Browns (1947) and New York Giants (1949–56).

Early life 

Thompson was born in Oklahoma City, Oklahoma.

Negro leagues 

At the beginning of his career, he was a hard-hitting star for the Monarchs in the Negro American League, playing both infield and outfield. At 17, he played right field in his first season, batting .300.

World War II 

The following year he was drafted into the Army. Thompson was a machine gunner with the 1695th Combat Engineers at the historic Battle of the Bulge.  A few years later, he was nicknamed Ametralladora (Spanish for "machine gun") by Cuban fans while playing in the Cuban Winter League.

Sergeant Thompson was discharged on June 20, 1946, and immediately returned to the Monarchs, who were in the midst of capturing the league title. With the start of the major league 1947 season, history was made when Jackie Robinson broke the color line with the Brooklyn Dodgers.

Major League debut 
Thompson played his first game with the Browns on July 17, 1947, integrating the Browns' lineup two days before Willard Brown made his debut as the second black player on the Browns. The following day, July 20, Thompson played second base and Brown played center field for the Browns in a game against the Boston Red Sox. That game marked the first time that two black players appeared in the same major league lineup. Later, in an August 9 doubleheader against the Cleveland Indians, Thompson and Indians outfielder Larry Doby became the first black players of opposing teams to appear on the field at the same time. Thompson was with the Browns a little over a month and hit only .256 in 27 games, mainly at second base. On August 23 he was released, and he rejoined the Monarchs through the 1948 season. Thompson batted .375 in his last year with Kansas City, finishing third in the batting race and leading the league in steals with 20.

New York Giants 

On July 4, 1949, the New York Giants called Thompson up from the Giants’ Jersey City farm club. He received $2,500 over the league minimum of $5,000. By signing with the Giants, Thompson earned a unique place in the baseball history. He was the first black baseball player to play in both the National and American leagues. Subsequently, he repeated the same "first" many times. On July 8, 1949, Thompson and Monte Irvin became the first black players for the Giants. Thus Thompson became the only player to participate in breaking the segregation barrier on two different teams. Another first occurred when Thompson batted against Dodgers pitcher Don Newcombe in the same season, becoming the first black batter to face a black pitcher in the majors. And in 1951, after playing a strong role in the Giants' drive to the pennant, Thompson and Irvin teamed with Willie Mays in the World Series to form the first all-black outfield in the majors. However, for the remainder of his career he played mostly at third base.

On August 16, 1950, Hank Thompson became the first player since 1939 to hit two inside-the-park home runs in one game, a feat which would not be duplicated again until 1972. He enjoyed his best season in 1953, when he batted .302 with 24 home runs, 74 runs batted in and a .567 slugging average. In 1954 he hit 26 homers and drove 86 runs, belted three homers in one game, and in the World Series batted .364 and drew a four-game Series record of seven walks against Cleveland.

In his 9-year career Thompson batted .267, with 129 home runs, 482 runs batted in, 492 runs scored, 801 hits, 104 doubles, 34 triples, 33 stolen bases, 493 walks for a .372 on-base percentage and 1,360 total bases for a .453 slugging average. In 1957 his contract was sold to the minor league Minneapolis Millers of the American Association, where he finished his career.

Post-baseball struggles and death 

After leaving baseball, Thompson met with a series of difficulties. He became a cab driver in New York, but following a divorce was convicted of armed robbery in Texas, and in 1963 was sentenced to 10 years in prison. In 1967, however, he was paroled after serving three years; in 1968 he moved to Fresno, California, and became a city playground director. In the summer of 1969 he left that position, possibly to seek a job with the National League; but those plans did not have a chance to materialize. Thompson died at the age of 43 following a seizure on September 30, 1969, 13 years to the day of his last game in the majors.

See also
List of first black Major League Baseball players
 List of Negro league baseball players who played in Major League Baseball

References

External links
 and Seamheads
Negro league player page at Negro League Baseball Players Association 
 

1925 births
1969 deaths
Sportspeople from Oklahoma City
African-American baseball players
Kansas City Monarchs players
United States Army soldiers
United States Army personnel of World War II
Baseball players from Oklahoma
Major League Baseball third basemen
Major League Baseball second basemen
Major League Baseball outfielders
St. Louis Browns players
New York Giants (NL) players
American people convicted of robbery
American sportspeople convicted of crimes
Prisoners and detainees of Texas
20th-century African-American sportspeople